Kannod is a town situated in Malwa region of Madhya Pradesh, India. It is surrounded by the Vindhya Range from three sides. It is well connected with Indore, Harda, Khandwa and Bhopal.
Area code 07273

Etymology 
The ancient name of Kannod was Kannar which was adopted from the name of King Kanna. Kanna was the king of the Gond community.

Demographics

As of the 2011 Census of India, Kannod had a population of 17,575. Males constitute 51.20% of the population and females 48.80%. Kannod has an average literacy rate of 63%, higher than the national average of 59.5%: male literacy is 72%, and female literacy is 53%. In Kannod, 15% of the population is under 6 years of age.
Mr Ashish sharma is the current MLA

Connectivity

Rail
Kannod has no rail connectivity. The nearest important railway station is Indore Junction railway station and Harda railway station.

Air
The nearest airport is Bhopal and Devi Ahilyabai Holkar Airport, Indore.

Climate

References 

Cities and towns in Dewas district